Fernando Matthei Aubel (11 July 1925 – 19 November 2017) was a Chilean Air Force general who was part of the military junta that ruled Chile from 1973 to 1990, replacing the dismissed Gustavo Leigh as commander-in-chief of the Chilean Air Force on 24 July 1978. He was part of the Junta from 1978 to 1990, and served as minister of health from 1976 to 1978, retiring from the Air Force in July 1991.

Military career
The son of Fernando Matthei Aubel Gunkel and Luisa Gunkel Renz, Matthei entered the Aviation School in 1945 and the following year he was assigned to the Condors Air Base, where he obtained his appointment as a fighter pilot. In 1948, he was commissioned as a sublieutenant and was assigned to the No. 4 Bomber Group in Colina, serving concurrently as a flight instructor at the School of Aviation and Officers. He was promoted to lieutenant in 1951. That same year he married Elda Fornet, with whom he had five children: Fernando, Evelyn, Robert, Hedy Jaqueline and Victor Alejandro.

In 1953 he traveled to the United States to study flight instruction at Craig Air Force Base in Alabama. He was promoted to flight captain in 1954, teaching classes in arms at the Aviation School. In 1957, he was assigned to Wing 1 in the Antofagasta Cerro Moreno Base.

Posted to Santiago in 1960, he was promoted to squadron commander and sent to the School of Aviation. He became the adjutant to the air force commander in chief, General Eduardo Iensen, the following year.

In 1966 he was promoted to group commander and served as commander of Aviation Group Nº7 between 1968 and 1969, when he was sent to visit facilities of the Royal Air Force (RAF). On his return home, he was appointed professor at the Air War Academy. From October 1969 he was a professor of the Pilots Course for Tactical Hawker Hunter Aircraft in Aviation Group No. 7.

In November 1971, he served as air attaché in the Chilean embassies in Britain and Sweden, based in London. On 12 October 1973, he was appointed Chief of the Air Mission of Chile in London.

After the military coup in December 1973, he returned to Chile as director of the Air Force Academy. In January 1975, Matthei was promoted to air brigade general. On 19 March 1976 he was appointed Minister of Health.

The 24 July 1978, after the dismissal of General Gustavo Leigh and of most generals of the institution, Matthei was promoted to air general and appointed commander of the air force and a member of the military junta, occupying the Second Legislative Committee chair.

Political career
Before becoming a junta member, Matthei was Minister of Health of the military government.

In October 1988, Matthei was pivotal in preventing another power grab by Pinochet after the dictator lost the referendum to elect him for a new eight-year presidential term. In the wake of his electoral defeat, Pinochet had convened a meeting of his junta at La Moneda, in which he requested that they give him extraordinary powers to have the military seize the capital. Matthei refused, saying that he would not agree to such a thing under any circumstances, and the rest of the junta followed his lead. Later the same day, the government stated that the referendum result would be respected and that the 1980 Constitution path to democracy would be strictly followed. Pinochet backed down and accepted the result. The ensuing Constitutional process led to presidential and legislative elections the following year.

In 1990, with the return of democracy, Matthei ceased to be a member of the military junta, but retained his position as the commander in chief of the Air Force. He retired voluntarily on 31 July 1991 (although, as Pinochet, he could have continued to serve until 1998) and noted that with his retirement, the air force could fully adapt to democracy.

2003 saw the publishing of the book Matthei. Mi testimonio, written by Chilean historians Patricia Arancibia and Isabel de la Maza, in which Matthei recounts his public life.

In September 2005, Matthei admitted in a television program that he "did everything possible so that Argentina would lose" the 1982 Falklands War with Britain. The extent of Chilean assistance to the UK is documented in a book, My Secret Falklands War, by retired Royal Air Force Wing Commander Sidney Edwards, who was sent to Chile by the British government to act as a liaison between the Chilean and British governments during the conflict.

Matthei was born among a community of German Chileans in Southern Chile. Matthei was the father of Chilean senator and 2013 presidential candidate and current mayor of Providencia Evelyn Matthei.

He died in 2017 and was buried in Parque del Recuerdo, Santiago de Chile.

Literature 

Arancibia P. y de la Maza I. (2003) Matthei. Mi testimonio. La Tercera/Mondadori, Santiago.

References

External links
Allegations of human rights violations  

1925 births
2017 deaths
Chilean Air Force generals
Chilean anti-communists
Chilean Lutherans
Chilean Ministers of Health
Chilean people of German descent
Chilean people of Swiss descent
Heads of state of Chile
People from Osorno, Chile
Ministers of the military dictatorship of Chile (1973–1990)
20th-century Chilean military personnel
Air attachés
People of the Falklands War